Gregorio Pagani (14 July 1559 – 1605) was an Italian painter of the late 16th century, active mainly in Florence. He was the son of the painter Francesco Pagani, then became a pupil of Santi di Tito, then entered the studio of Ludovico Cigoli. He painted the St. Helena finding the Cross for Santa Maria del Carmine, which was lost in the fire at the church in 1771. He painted a Nativity for the cathedral of Santa Maria del Fiore. Among his pupils were Cristofano Allori and Matteo Rosselli.

References

Selected works
 Confirmation of the Rule of Saint Dominic
 Meeting between SS Dominic and Francis
 Finding of the True Cross
 Crucifixion and Saints
 Saint Lawrence
 Assumption of the Virgin, San Michele à Montevettolini church, Monsummano Terme
 Adoration of the Magi
 Descent of the Holy Spirit
 Tobias Restoring the Sight of his Father
 Virgin and Child with SS Michael the Archangel and Benedict
 Piramus and Thisbe or Pyramus and Thisbe (Uffizi Gallery, Florence)
 Madonna and Child with Saints Francis of Assisi, John the Baptist, Margaret and Gregory the Great (Hermitage Museum, Saint Petersburg)

1558 births
1605 deaths
16th-century Italian painters
Italian male painters
17th-century Italian painters
Painters from Florence
Italian Mannerist painters